David McCann (born 20 June 2000) is an Irish rugby union player who plays in the back row for Ulster

He attended Royal Belfast Academical Institution, with whom he won the Ulster Schools' Cup in 2016 and 2017, played club rugby with Banbridge, and joined the Ulster academy ahead of the 2018–19 season. He won Academy Player of the Year in the 2020 Ulster Rugby Awards. He captained Ulster 'A' and the Ireland under-20s. He made his senior debut for Ulster on 2 October 2020 in a 35–24 home victory against Benetton Treviso, and signed a senior contract ahead of the 2020–21 season.

References

External links
Ulster Rugby profile
United Rugby Championship profile

2000 births
Living people
Irish rugby union players
Ulster Rugby players
Rugby union flankers
Rugby union number eights